Keystroke dynamics, keystroke biometrics, typing dynamics and typing biometrics refer to the detailed timing information that describes when each key was pressed and released as a person is typing on a computer keyboard.

Science 

The behavioural biometric of Keystroke Dynamics uses the manner and rhythm in which an individual types characters on a keyboard or keypad. The keystroke rhythms of a user are measured to develop a unique biometric template of the user's typing pattern for future authentication. Keystrokes are separated into static and dynamic typing, which are used to help distinguish between authorized and unauthorized users. Vibration information may be used to create a pattern for future use in both identification and authentication tasks.

Data needed to analyse keystroke dynamics is obtained by keystroke logging. Normally, all that is retained when logging a typing session is the sequence of characters corresponding to the order in which keys were pressed. Timing information is discarded. For example, when reading an email, the receiver cannot tell from reading the phrase "I saw 3 zebras!" whether: 
it was typed rapidly or slowly,
the sender used the left shift key, the right shift key, or the caps-lock key to make the "i" turn into a capitalized letter "I,"
the letters were all typed at the same pace, or if there was a long pause before any characters while looking for that key, and
the sender typed any letters wrong initially and then went back and corrected them, or if they got them right the first time.

History 

During the late nineteenth century, telegram operators began to develop unique "signatures" that could be identified simply by their tapping rhythm. As late as World War II, the military transmitted messages through Morse Code. Using a methodology called "The Fist of the Sender," military intelligence identified that an individual had a unique way of keying in a message's "dots" and "dashes", creating a rhythm that could help distinguish ally from enemy.

Use as biometric data 

Keystroke dynamic information could be used to verify or even try to determine the identity of the person who is producing the keystrokes. The techniques used to do this vary widely in sophistication, and range from statistical techniques to artificial intelligence (AI) approaches like neural networks.

The time to seek and depress a key (seek-time) and the time the key is held-down (hold-time) may be very characteristic for a person, regardless of how fast they are typing overall. Most people have specific letters that take longer to find or get to than their average seek-time for all letters. Which letters vary dramatically and consistently for different people. Right-handed people may be statistically faster in getting to keys they hit with their right-hand fingers than with their left-hand fingers. Index fingers may be characteristically faster than other fingers, consistent for a person regardless of their overall speed that day.

In addition, sequences of letters may have characteristic properties for a person. In English, the word "the" is very common, and those three letters may be known as a rapid-fire sequence and not as just three meaningless letters hit in that order. Common endings, such as "ing", may be entered far faster than, say, the same letters in reverse order ("gni") to the degree that varies consistently by a person. This consistency may hold and reveal the person's native language's common sequences even when they are writing entirely in a different language, just as revealing as an accent might in spoken English.

Common "errors" may also be quite characteristic of a person. There is an entire taxonomy of errors, such as this person's most common "substitutions", "reversals", "drop-outs", "double-strikes", "adjacent letter hits", "homonyms", hold-length-errors (for a shift key held down too short or too long a time).  Even without knowing what language a person is working in, these errors might be detected by looking at the rest of the text and what letters the person goes back and replaces. Again, the patterns of errors might be sufficiently different to distinguish two people.

Authentication versus identification 

Keystroke dynamics is part of a larger class of biometrics known as behavioural biometrics, a field in which observed patterns are statistical in nature. Because of this inherent uncertainty, a commonly held belief is that behavioural biometrics are not as reliable as biometrics used for authentication based on physically observable characteristics such as fingerprints or retinal scans or DNA.  Behavioral biometrics use a confidence measurement instead of the traditional pass/fail measurements.  As such, the traditional benchmarks of False Acceptance Rate (FAR) and False Rejection Rates (FRR) no longer have linear relationships.

The benefit to keystroke dynamics (as well as other behavioural biometrics) is that FRR/FAR can be adjusted by changing the acceptance threshold at the individual level. This allows for explicitly defined individual risk mitigation–something physical biometric technologies could not achieve.

One of the major problems that keystroke dynamics runs into is that a person's typing varies substantially during a day and between different days and may be affected by any number of external factors.

Because of these variations, any system will make false-positive and false-negative errors. Some successful commercial products have strategies to handle these issues and have proven effective in large-scale use in real-world settings and applications.

Legal and regulatory issues 

Use of keylogging software may be in direct and explicit violation of local laws, such as the U.S. Patriot Act, under which such use may constitute wire-tapping. This could have severe legal penalties. See spyware for a better description of user-consent issues and various fraud statutes.

Patents 

 
 
  
 P. Nordström, J. Johansson. Security system and method for detecting intrusion in a computerized system. Patent No. 2 069 993, European Patent Office, 2009.

Other uses 
Because human beings generate keystroke timings, they are not well correlated with external processes. They are frequently used as a source of hardware-generated random numbers for computer systems.

See also 
 Fist (telegraphy)

References

Other references

Checco, J. (2003). Keystroke Dynamics & Corporate Security.  WSTA Ticker Magazine, .

iMagic Software.  (vendor web-site   May 2006). Notes: Vendor specializing in keystroke authentication for large enterprises.
AdmitOne Security - formerly BioPassword. (vendor web-site home  [Web Page]. URL . Notes: Vendor specializing in keystroke dynamics
Garcia, J. (Inventor). (1986). Personal identification apparatus. (USA 4621334). Notes: US Patent Office - 
Bender, S and Postley, H.  (Inventors) (2007).  Key sequence rhythm recognition system and method.   (USA 7206938), Notes: US Patent Office - 
Joyce, R., & Gupta, G. (1990). Identity authorization based on keystroke latencies. Communications of the ACM, 33(2), 168-176. Notes: Review up through 1990

 much cited

Monrose, F. R. M. K., & Wetzel, S. (1999). Password hardening based on keystroke dynamics. Proceedings of the 6th ACM Conference on Computer and Communications Security,  73-82. Notes: Kent Ridge Digital Labs, Singapore

Young, J. R., & Hammon, R. W. (Inventors). (1989). Method and apparatus for verifying an individual's identity. 4805222). Notes: US Patent Office -  
Vertical Company LTD. (vendor web-site  October 2006). Notes: Vendor specializing in keystroke authentication solutions for government and commercial agencies.
Lopatka, M. & Peetz, M.H. (2009). Vibration Sensitive Keystroke Analysis. Proceedings of the 18th Annual Belgian-Dutch Conference on Machine Learning,  75-80.
Coalfire Systems Compliance Validation Assessment (2007) https://web.archive.org/web/20110707084309/http://www.admitonesecurity.com/admitone_library/AOS_Compliance_Functional_Assessment_by_Coalfire.pdf

Further reading
 
 

User interfaces
Biometrics